Huy Kanthoul (1 February 1909 – 13 September 1991) was the Prime Minister of Cambodia from 1951 to 1952.

References

 

1909 births
1991 deaths
20th-century Cambodian politicians 
Prime Ministers of Cambodia
Cambodian expatriates in France 
Democratic Party (Cambodia) politicians 
People from Phnom Penh